Tao is the tenth studio album  by Rock singer Rick Springfield. It was released in 1985 on RCA Records.

Track listing
All songs written by Rick Springfield, except where noted.
"Dance This World Away"  (Tim Pierce, Springfield)  - 4:36
"Celebrate Youth" - 4:24 (the song is 3:53 followed by a 30-second outro featuring a child's voice repeating the words "who's there")
"State of the Heart"  (Eric McCusker, Tim Pierce, Springfield) - 4:02
"Written in Rock" - 4:34
"The Power of Love (The Tao of Love)" - 5:00
"Walking on the Edge" - 5:09
"Walk Like a Man" - 4:14
"The Tao of Heaven" - 1:28
"Stranger in the House" - 4:03
"My Father's Chair" - 3:27

Total length: 41:02

Production
With Tao, Springfield decided to experiment with new wave and synthrock. Springfield noted in a 2012 interview, "Tao had a lot of European influences and I perhaps went a little bit too far in that direction. The production was more European orientated, with the massive synths and that stuff actually did it really well in Europe, especially in Germany, "Celebrate Youth" was a hit." Springfield considers Tao to be his finest album to date. "We just had a lot of new ideas. It is probably the one I experimented on the most. Whatever I thought of we tried it. It was just when sampling was just starting, we got really into the drum sampling. But we started on just a DMX. A little DMX drum machine, all the original drum tracks were laid down on that, and then we triggered other drum samples from that. It was built up track by track. That is still my favorite album." Springfield recalls, "I had stopped listening to American rock by 1984. In fact, I was getting increasingly interested in what was going on in other types of music, especially with artists who were English."

In the liner notes for the collector's edition CD of Tao Springfield comments, "I was going through a major depression back then, and had been for a  few years. I was spiritually lost, and finding it hard to cope with everything that was going on. Even my success was causing me pain. I couldn't come to terms with earning so much money while others were struggling to find small change even to eat. It seemed so wrong, but what could I do about it? On top of that, I had real problems dealing with my father's death. It all meant that I was in such a mess, which is why the lyrics on the "Tao" album are definitely the darkest of my career."

Critical reception

Tao was dismissed by Rolling Stone’s Wild as "an overwrought, misguided bid for respectability." Voicing similar concerns, Stereo Review contributor Steve Simels explained what he viewed as "production overkill" by suggesting that Springfield may have had "lingering suspicions that he’s a pretty face rather than a musician." Still, Simels did note that "when he’s dealing with relationships, Springfield is capable of writing with a fair amount of verbal facility and genuine feeling." On US game shows at the time, RCA Records had a fee plug for their records, and this album was showcased in the fee plugs.

Cash Box described the lead single "Celebrate Youth" as a "slamming rocker" and an "impassioned anthem."

Personnel
Rick Springfield - lead vocals and backing vocals, electric guitar, Emulator II, Oberheim DMX, bass, DX7 and Roland JX-3P,
Mitchell Froom - Emulator II, Optigan and Yamaha DX7
Tim Pierce - electric guitar and Roland GR707
John Philip Shenale - PPG Wave, Oberheim OB8 and Yamaha DX7
Jeff Silverman - Roland GR707
Pino Palladino - fretless bass
Nicky Hopkins - Yamaha DX7 and Roland JX-3P
Richard Page, Edie Lehmann - backing vocals on "Dance This World Away"
Tommy Funderburk, Tom Kelly, Mike Selfrit - backing vocals
Nigel Lundemo Pierce - "talking boy" on "Celebrate Youth"
Produced by Rick Springfield and Bill Drescher
Engineered by Bill Drescher
Mastered by Greg Fulginiti

Charts

Weekly charts

Year-end charts

Certifications

References

Rick Springfield albums
1985 albums
RCA Records albums